Nataša Bajin-Šljepica (born 29 September 1945) is a Serbian-Yugoslavian gymnast. She competed at the 1968 Summer Olympics and the 1972 Summer Olympics.

References

External links
 

1945 births
Living people
Serbian female artistic gymnasts
Olympic gymnasts of Yugoslavia
Gymnasts at the 1968 Summer Olympics
Gymnasts at the 1972 Summer Olympics
Sportspeople from Belgrade